Woodville High School is a public high school located in the city of Woodville, Texas in Tyler County, United States and classified as a 3A school by the UIL. It is a part of the Woodville Independent School District located in central Tyler County. In 2015, the school was rated "Met Standard" by the Texas Education Agency.

State Representative James E. White from District 19 is a former faculty member at Woodville High School.

Athletics

The Woodville Eagles compete in these sports - 

Baseball
Basketball
Cross Country
Football
Golf
Powerlifting
Softball
Tennis
Track and Field
Volleyball

State Titles
Woodville (UIL)

Baseball 
2005(2A)

Woodville Scott (PVIL)

Boys Basketball 
1957(PVIL-1A), 1958(PVIL-1A)
Girls Track 
1963(PVIL-2A), 1966(PVIL-2A)

Notable alumni
Hugh Pitts, former NFL player

References

External links
Woodville ISD website

Public high schools in Texas
Schools in Tyler County, Texas